The Gerald Loeb Award is given annually for multiple categories of business reporting. The "Video/Audio" category replaced "Broadcast" in 2014 and 2015. It was split into separate "Audio" and "Video" categories beginning in 2016.

Gerald Loeb Award winners for Video/Audio (2014–2015)
 2014: "Under the Hood: The AAMCO Investigation," by Tisha Thompson, Rick Yarborough, Jeff Piper, and Mike Goldrick, WRC-TV
 2015: "Inside Sysco: Exposing North America’s Food Sheds" by Vicky Nguyen, Kevin Nious, Jeremy Carroll, Felipe Escamilla, David Paredes, Julie Putnam and Mark Villarreal, KNTV

Videos in Series:
"Raw Meat Found in Unrefrigerated Storage Sheds", July 9, 2013
"Sysco Corporation Facing Fines for Storing Food in Outdoor Sheds", July 10, 2013
"Food in Dirty Sheds Served to Bay Area Restaurants", July 16, 2013
"Sysco Regrets Storing Food in Sheds Throughout US and Canada", September 6, 2013
"Sysco Employees: Food Sheds Used Throughout U.S., Canada", September 10, 2013
"Food Giant Sysco Under USDA Investigation", September 30, 2013
"Records Show Sysco Drivers Dangerously Over Hours", November 27, 2013
"Timeline: NBC Bay Area Investigation Into Sysco Corporation and Food Safety", November 27, 2013
"FDA Unveils Plan to Bring New Oversight of Food Distribution", January 31, 2014
"Sysco Fined Millions for Food Safety Violations", July 17, 2014

Gerald Loeb Award winners for Audio (2016–present)
 2016: "Your Money and Your Life" by Chris Arnold, Uri Berliner, Neal Carruth, Lori Todd, John Ydstie, Heidi Glenn, Ariel Zambelich, Avie Schneider, Alyson Hurt and Annette Elizabeth Allen, NPR
 2017: "Dov Charney’s American Dream" by Lisa Chow, Kaitlin Roberts, Molly Messick, Bruce Wallace, Luke Malone, Simone Polanen, Alex Blumberg and Alexandra Johnes for Gimlet Media

Stories in Series:
"Part 3: Photos", November 18, 2016
"Part 4: Boundaries", December 2, 2016
"Part 5: Suits", December 8, 2016
"Part 6: Anger", December 16, 2016
"Part 7: MAGIC", December 22, 2016

 2018: "Robot-Proof Jobs" by David Brancaccio, Katie Long, Nicole Childers, Ben Tolliday, Daniel Ramirez, and Paulina Velasco for Marketplace
 2019: "Medicaid, Under the Influence" by Liz Essley White, Joe Yerardi and Alison Fitzgerald Kodjak, The Center for Public Integrity and NPR

Stories in Series:
Investigation: Patients' Drug Options Under Medicaid Heavily Influenced By Drugmakers, July 18, 2018
How Drug Companies Control How Their Drugs Are Covered By Medicaid, July 18, 2018
Louisiana's New Approach To Treating Hepatitis C, July 19, 2018

 2020: "Amazon: Behind the Smiles" by Will Evans, Katharine Mieszkowski, Taki Telonidis, Rachel de Leon, Kevin Sullivan, Najib Aminy, Andrew Donohue, Esther Kaplan, Matt Thompson, John Barth, Al Letson, Melissa Lewis, Hannah Young, Byard Duncan, David Rodriguez, Mwende Hinojosa, Jim Briggs, Fernando Arruda, and Reveal staff, Reveal from the Center for Investigative Reporting and PRX

 2021: "American Rehab" by Shoshona Walter, Laura Starecheski, Ike Sriskandarajah, Brett Myers, Kevin Sullivan, Jim Briggs, Fernando Arruda, Katharine Mieszkowski, Najib Aminy, Rosemarie Ho, Al Letson, Amy Julia Harris, Amy Mostafa, Matt Thompson, Esther Kaplan, Andy Donohue, Amanda Pike, Narda Zacchino, Gabe Hongsdusit, Sarah Mirk, Claire Mullen, Byard Duncan, David Rodriguez, Eren K. Wilson, and Hannah Young, Reveal from the Center for Investigative Reporting and PRX

Stories in Series:
"A Desperate Call"
"Miracle on The Beach"
"A Venomous Snake"
"Cowboy Conman"
"Reagan with The Snap"
"The White Vans"
"The Work Cure"
"Shadow Workforce"

 2022: - "'We're Coming for You': For Public Health Officials, a Year of Threats and Menace" by Anna Maria Barry-Jester and Miki Meek, Kaiser Health News and This American Life

Gerald Loeb Award winners for Video (2016–present)
 2016: "Joanna Stern's Videos," by Joanna Stern and Drew Evans for The Wall Street Journal
 2017: "Cosecha de Miseria (Harvest of Misery) & The Source" by Greg Gilderman, Marisa Venegas, Neil Katz, Solly Granatstein, Shawn Efran, Marcus Stern, Brandon Kieffer, John Carlos Frey, Mónica Villamizar and Manuel Iglesias Perez for Telemundo Network and Weather.com/The Weather Channel

Videos:
"Cosecha de Miseria (Harvest of Misery)", December 19, 2016
"The Source", January 19, 2017

 2018: "Future of Money" by Chris Buck, Kyra Darnton, Solana Pyne, Laurence B. Chollet, Karen M. Sughrue, Erik German, Maria Villaseñor, Noah Madoff, and Jeff Bernier for Retro Report and Quartz
 2019: "Blackout in Puerto Rico" by Rick Young, Laura Sullivan, Emma Schwartz, Fritz Kramer and Kate McCormick, Frontline, PBS, and NPR

Stories in Series:
Blackout in Puerto Rico, April 18, 2018
How FEMA Failed To Help Victims Of Hurricanes in Puerto Rico Recover, May 1, 2018
How Puerto Rico's Debt Created A Perfect Storm Before The Storm, May 2, 2018

 2020: "'Zone Rouge': An Army of Children Toils in African Mines" by Cynthia McFadden, Christine Romo, Lisa Cavazuti, Bill Angelucci, and Daniel Nagin, NBC News Investigative Unit
 2021: "Opioids, Inc." by Thomas Jennings, Annie Wong, Nick Verbitsky, Hannah Kuchler, Rebecca Blandón, Anna Auster, and Shaunagh Connaire, Frontline and Financial Times

Stories in Series:
"Opioids, Bribery And Wall Street: The Inside Story Of A Disgraced Drugmaker", June 18, 2020
"Opioids, Ic.", June 23, 2020
"Insys Executives Are Sentenced to Prison Time, Putting Opioid Makers On Notice", June 23, 2020

 2022: "Framing Britney Spears" by Liz Day and Samantha Stark, The New York Times, FX, and ''Hulu

Documentaries:
"Framing Britney Spears"
"Controlling Britney Spears"

References

External links
 Gerald Loeb Award historical winners list

 
American journalism awards
Gerald Loeb Award winners